Gloria Kotnik (born 1 June 1989) is a Slovenian snowboarder. She competed at the 2010 Winter Olympics, where she finished 27th in parallel giant slalom. At the 2014 Winter Olympics, she finished 24th in parallel giant slalom. At the 2022 Winter Olympics, she won a bronze medal in the women's parallel giant slalom event. This was also her first podium in career as her best results in World Cup competition prior to the 2022 Olympics were three fourth places.

Winter Olympics results 
 1 medal – (1 bronze)

Personal life
Kotnik studied management at University of Primorska. In March 2020, she decided to take a break from competitive sport due to burnout and to focus on family. In January 2021, she gave birth to a son, named Maj. She returned to competing in December 2021.

References

1989 births
Living people
Sportspeople from Slovenj Gradec
Slovenian female snowboarders
Snowboarders at the 2010 Winter Olympics
Snowboarders at the 2014 Winter Olympics
Snowboarders at the 2018 Winter Olympics
Snowboarders at the 2022 Winter Olympics
Medalists at the 2022 Winter Olympics
Olympic snowboarders of Slovenia
Olympic bronze medalists for Slovenia
Olympic medalists in snowboarding
Universiade medalists in snowboarding
Universiade bronze medalists for Slovenia
Competitors at the 2011 Winter Universiade
21st-century Slovenian women